Ed Quirk may refer to:

 Ed Quirk (American football) (1925–1962), American football fullback
 Ed Quirk (rugby union) (born 1991), Australian rugby union footballer